Orthotylus beieri is a species of bug from the Miridae family that can be found in France, Slovenia, and Spain.

References

Insects described in 1942
Hemiptera of Europe
beieri